John Gustavus Handcock (1720 – 26 February 1766) was an Irish politician.

He was the sixth son of William Handcock and his wife Susan Warburton, daughter of Richard Warburton. His older brother was William Handcock and his cousins were William Handcock, 1st Viscount Castlemaine and Richard Handcock, 2nd Baron Castlemaine. In 1761, Handcock entered the Irish House of Commons, representing Ballyshannon until his death in 1766.

On 6 August 1755, he married Margaret Caroline Wilson. Their marriage was childless.

References

1720 births
1766 deaths
Irish MPs 1761–1768
Members of the Parliament of Ireland (pre-1801) for County Donegal constituencies